TI PLT SHH1 (Personal Learning Tool, Spot Hand Held) is a prototype calculator created by Texas Instruments as an early attempt to develop a Linux-based calculator. It features an ARM based OMAP 1510 processor, 16 MB RAM, and an SD slot. In conjunction with its TI PLT-FHH1 Personal Learning Tool, Fido Hand Held and TI PLT-SU1 Personal Learning Tool, second generation are prototype calculators. The project was eventually scrapped by TI in early 2004. However, a few of the early prototypes such as the PLT SHH1 leaked to the public, making it one of a few rare prototypes among collectors. A few elements of its design, including its large screen and casing, seem to have been reappropriated for use in the TI-Nspire.
PLT-FHH1 Personal Learning Tool, Fido Hand Held  · PLT-WS1 Personal Learning Tool, Wireless Sled (PET project was canceled)

Similar products

TI-Nspire
Casio ClassPad 300
HP Xpander (project was canceled)

References

Article and statistics of the TI-PLT_SHH1
Article and statistics of the TI-PLT FHH1
Article and statistics of the TI-PLT_SU1
Ticalc.org Article on the TI PLT SHH1

Texas Instruments calculators
Linux-based devices